East Renfreshire by-election may refer to one of three parliamentary by-elections held for the British House of Commons constituency of East Renfrewshire, in Scotland:

1926 East Renfrewshire by-election
1930 East Renfrewshire by-election
1940 East Renfrewshire by-election

See also

East Renfrewshire (UK Parliament constituency)